Kerakat is one of five assembly constituencies in the Machhlishahr Lok Sabha constituency. Since 2008, this assembly constituency is numbered 372 amongst 403 constituencies.

Election results

2022

2017
Bharatiya Janta Party candidate Dinesh Choudhary, won in 2017 Uttar Pradesh Legislative Elections defeating Samajwadi Party candidate Sanjaj Saroj by a margin of 15,259 votes.

History
The first Member of Kerakat legislative Assembly is Lal Bahadur INC and Parmeshari INC.

Ward/Area
Kerakat, Chandwak, Dobhi, Muftiganj, Huruhuri, Ratanupur, Parauganj, Thanagaddi Deokali, Itaili, Hebhal etc.

Members of Legislative Assembly

See also
First Legislative Assembly of Uttar Pradesh

References

External links
 

Assembly constituencies of Uttar Pradesh
Kerakat
Politics of Jaunpur district